Justin Charles Anderson (born September 28, 1992) is an American professional baseball pitcher who is a free agent. The Los Angeles Angels selected him in the 14th round of the 2014 MLB draft. He made his Major League Baseball (MLB) debut in 2018.

High school and college
Anderson attended St. Pius X High School in Houston, Texas, and the University of Texas at San Antonio (UTSA). He played college baseball for the UTSA Roadrunners from 2012 through 2014. The Angels selected him in the 14th round of the 2014 MLB draft.

Career

Los Angeles Angels
After signing with the Angels, Anderson was assigned to the Orem Owlz of the Rookie-level Pioneer League before being reassigned to the Arizona Angels of the Rookie-level Arizona League. In 29 innings pitched between the two teams, he had a 1–4 win–loss record with a 4.07 earned run average (ERA). In 2015, he played for the Burlington Bees of the Class A Midwest League, and he compiled a 9–9 record, 3.41 ERA, and a 1.39 walks plus hits per inning pitched (WHIP) in 28 games (22 starts). 

He pitched for the Inland Empire 66ers of the Class A-Advanced California League in 2016, where he went 8–12 (2nd in the league in losses) with a 5.70 ERA in 28 games (27 starts), over 145.1 innings (4th in the league). Anderson moved to the bullpen in 2017 and played Inland Empire and the Mobile BayBears of the Class AA Southern League, posting a 3–2 record and 5.06 ERA in 46 relief appearances.

In 2018, Anderson began the season with Mobile, and after  scoreless innings, was promoted to the Salt Lake Bees of the Class AAA Pacific Coast League. The Angels promoted him to the major leagues on April 23, 2018. He made his major league debut that night. Anderson would appear in 57 games, going 3-3 and recording 4 saves with a 4.07 ERA, and striking out 67 in  innings (averaging 10.9 strikeouts per 9 innings) while walking 40 batters. The following season, Anderson's inconsistency proved to be his downfall as he registered an ERA of 5.55 in 54 games. He had a K/BB ratio of 60/32 in 47 innings.

In July 2020, Anderson underwent Tommy John surgery, and would miss the 2020 season. On December 2, Anderson was nontendered by the Angels.

Texas Rangers
On January 13, 2021, Anderson signed a two-year, minor league contract with the Texas Rangers organization. He elected free agency on November 10, 2022.

References

External links

1992 births
Living people
Baseball players from Houston
Major League Baseball pitchers
Los Angeles Angels players
UTSA Roadrunners baseball players
Orem Owlz players
Arizona League Angels players
Burlington Bees players
Inland Empire 66ers of San Bernardino players
Scottsdale Scorpions players
Mobile BayBears players
Salt Lake Bees players
Arizona Complex League Rangers players
Round Rock Express players